Adamivka ( Adamivka) is a village in northern Ukraine, in Zviahel Raion of Zhytomyr Oblast. The code KOATUUI: 1820655401. Its population is 15 people as 2001. Its postal index is 12724. Its calling code is 4144.

Village council
The village council is located at 12734, Ukraine, Zhytomyr Oblast, Baranivskiy district, town Dovbysh (urban-type settlement), st. Shchosa, 20.

External links
 Adamivka on website High Rada of Ukraine 

Villages in Zviahel Raion